Kilmyshall is a village in County Wexford, Ireland, about  south of Bunclody. The population was 149 at the 2016 census. The 19th-century folklorist Patrick Kennedy was born in Kilmyshall. The village's Catholic church, Saint Mary Magdalene's, was completed in 1831.

References

Towns and villages in County Wexford